The Kilohana Art League was formed in 1894 as Honolulu’s first art association.  On May 5, 1894, the woodcarver Augusta Graham, the sculptor Allen Hutchinson, and painters D. Howard Hitchcock and Annie H. Park created a forum where local artists could exhibit together and share ideas.  Other members included Alfred Richard Gurrey, Sr. and Bessie Wheeler.

"Kilohana" is a compound word derived from two Hawaiian language words: kilo meaning to observe carefully or to spy out, and hana, meaning work. The Kilohana Art League was disbanded in 1913, and its funds were transferred to The Outdoor Circle.

Organization

The League was organized into sub-organizations known as "circles", such as the Pictorial and Plastic Circle of the Kilohana Art League, the Dramatic Circle of the Kilohana Art League, the Musical Circle of the Kilohana Art League, the Literary Circle of the Kilohana Art League, and the Outdoor Circle of the Kilohana Art League.

References

Sources

External links

1894 establishments in Hawaii
1913 disestablishments in Hawaii
19th-century American painters
20th-century American painters
Artists from Hawaii
Arts organizations based in Hawaii
Arts organizations disestablished in the 20th century
Arts organizations established in 1894
Organizations disestablished in 1913